Frans Peeters (born August 30, 1956) is a sport shooter from Belgium. He won the Bronze Medal in Trap shooting in the  1988 Summer Olympics in Seoul.

References

1956 births
Living people
Belgian male sport shooters
Olympic medalists in shooting
Olympic shooters of Belgium
Olympic bronze medalists for Belgium
Shooters at the 1988 Summer Olympics
Shooters at the 1992 Summer Olympics
Shooters at the 1996 Summer Olympics
Trap and double trap shooters

Medalists at the 1988 Summer Olympics